Eustace III (c. 1050 – c. 1125) was the count of Boulogne from 1087 succeeding his father, Eustace II. He joined the First Crusade, being present at Nicaea, Dorylaeum, Antioch, and Jerusalem. After fighting in the battle of Ascalon, he returned home. Initially offered the Kingdom of Jerusalem, Eustace was at Apulia when he received news of Baldwin of Bourcq's election to the throne. On his return to Boulogne, he founded a Cluniac monastery in Rumilly, retired as a monk, and died in 1125.

Early life
Eustace was the son of Count Eustace II and Ida of Lorraine. In 1088, he rebelled against William II of England in favour of Robert Curthose. While waiting for Robert Curthose's arrival from Normandy, Eustace and his fellow compatriots were besieged at Rochester castle by William II. With provisions running out and the situation becoming dire within the castle, the rebels asked for terms. William II pardoned most of the rebels allowing those such as Eustace to return to Normandy. In 1091, Eustace was with Robert Curthose when the latter agreed to terms with William II, recognizing him as king of England.

Crusade
Eustace participated in the First Crusade of 1096 along with his brothers Godfrey of Bouillon (duke of Lower Lotharingia) and Baldwin of Boulogne. It is unclear whether he travelled eastward with his brother Godfrey's or Robert Curthose's army, although throughout the journey to Jerusalem, Eustace assisted Godfrey. Eustace was present at the siege of Nicaea (May–June 1097), helped rescue Bohemund of Taranto's beleaguered troops at the Battle of Dorylaeum (1 July 1097), defeated an enemy ambush during the siege of Antioch, and was one of the commanders during the capture of Antioch on 3 June 1098.

Eustace, as a member of the council held at Ruj on 4 January 1099, mediated the conflict over the control of Antioch between Bohemund of Taranto and Raymond IV of Toulouse. In early December 1098, Eustace joined Raymond's attack on Maarrat al-Nu'man and an attack on Nablus in July 1099. He gained notoriety for his actions during the siege of Jerusalem fighting relentlessly from a siege tower along with his brother Godfrey and the crusaders they commanded. They were among the first to breach Jerusalem's city walls and participated in the ensuing massacre. Eustace commanded a division of the crusader army during the Battle of Ascalon, and was a patron of the Knights Templar.

Return home
While his brothers stayed in the Holy Land, Eustace returned to administer his domains. To commemorate Eustace's crusading adventures, the mint at Boulogne struck silver coins with a lion above the walls of Jerusalem stamped on the obverse.

When his youngest brother Baldwin I of Jerusalem died in 1118, the elderly Eustace was offered the throne. Eustace was at first uninterested, but was convinced to accept it. He traveled all the way to Apulia before learning that a distant relative, Baldwin of Bourcq, had been crowned in the meantime. 

Eustace returned to Boulogne, founded the Cluniac house of Rumilly, and retired there as a Cluniac monk. He died about 1125.

On his death the county of Boulogne was inherited by his daughter, Matilda, and her husband Stephen de Blois, count of Mortain.

Marriage and issue
Eustace married Mary, daughter of King Malcolm III of Scotland and Saint Margaret of Scotland. Eustace and Mary had:
 Matilda of Boulogne, who became  queen consort of England by marriage to Stephen, King of England. She was also  Countess of Boulogne in her own right.

References

Sources

 

Counts of Boulogne
House of Boulogne
Christians of the First Crusade
11th-century births
1120s deaths
Place of birth missing
Place of death missing